Mulhall may refer to:

People
 Chris Mulhall (born 1988), Irish footballer
 David Mulhall, rugby player
 George Mulhall (1936–2018), Scottish footballer and manager
 Jack Mulhall (1887–1979), American film actor
 Laura Mulhall (born 1957), women's field hockey player
 Lucille Mulhall (1885–1940), rodeo performer
 Michael Mulhall (born 1962), Roman Catholic prelate
 Michael George Mulhall (1836-1900), Irish author, statistician, economist, and newspaper editor
 Stephen Mulhall (born 1962), philosopher

Places
 Mulhall, Oklahoma